Wellington Soares da Silva (born 18 June 1992), known as Wellington Rato, is a Brazilian footballer who plays as an attacking midfielder for São Paulo.

Club career
Wellington Rato was born in Japeri, Rio de Janeiro, and finished his formation with Audax. He made his senior debut with affiliate side Audax Rio in the 2012 Copa Rio, scoring eight goals for his side.

After leaving the club in December 2014, Wellington Rato subsequently represented Dom Bosco, Red Bull Brasil and Caldense before joining Sampaio Corrêa in the Série C in July 2017. He helped the side achieve promotion to the Série B in his first season, but subsequently started to feature sparingly.

On 18 December 2018, Wellington Rato was presented at Série D's Joinville, Roughty one year later, he moved to Ferroviário in the third division, where he became a regular starter.

On 27 September 2020, Wellington Rato agreed to a contract with Atlético Goianiense of the Série A. He made his top tier debut on 8 October, coming on as a second-half substitute for Chico in a 0–3 away loss against São Paulo.

Career statistics

Honours
Sampaio Corrêa
Copa do Nordeste: 2018

 Atlético Goianiense
Campeonato Goiano: 2022

References

External links

1992 births
Living people
Sportspeople from Rio de Janeiro (state)
Brazilian footballers
Association football midfielders
Brazilian expatriate sportspeople in Japan
Expatriate footballers in Japan
J2 League players
Campeonato Brasileiro Série A players
Campeonato Brasileiro Série B players
Campeonato Brasileiro Série C players
Campeonato Brasileiro Série D players
Audax Rio de Janeiro Esporte Clube players
Guaratinguetá Futebol players
Red Bull Brasil players
Associação Atlética Caldense players
Sampaio Corrêa Futebol Clube players
Joinville Esporte Clube players
Ferroviário Atlético Clube (CE) players
Atlético Clube Goianiense players
V-Varen Nagasaki players
São Paulo FC players